Polali Rajarajeshwari Temple is a temple located in Polali, Dakshina Kannada district in Karnataka. The primary deity of the temple is Shri Rajarajeshwari. The temple was constructed in the 8th century AD by King Suratha and has been developed by many dynasties which ruled over the region. The idol of Sri Rajarajeshwari, another name/form of the divine Goddess Sri Lalita Tripurasundari, is completely moulded from clay with special medicinal properties. The temple portrays Hindu architecture with roofs adorned with wooden carvings of gods and copper plates. Daily and special poojas are conducted in the temple under the auspices of the head priest madhava bhat. Annual festivals are held in the temple with much fanfare. Polali Chendu festival is an important festive event where football is played to represent the fight of good over evil. The Chendu festival is followed by the annual festival in March, which lasts for a month and is attended by people from all over the world.

Location
The temple is located in Polali on the banks of the river Phalguni in Kariyangala village of Bantwal taluk, Dakshina Kannada, Karnataka. The temple is surrounded by lush paddy fields. The Phalguni river flows on the northern side of the temple. The nearest city from the temple is Mangalore at 19 km away.< near to kaikamba 4 to 5 km across >;

Etymology
The place where the temple was located was known as Pural in ancient times. The word Pural means Flute in Tulu language. The origin of the word Pural is the Mugera language. The word Pural or Purel also has the meaning of changing sides, which may also apply in this case as the river takes an abrupt turn near the temple. In Sanskrit, it was referred to as Paliapura, which later came to be known as Polali in Kannada. In several ancient epigraphs and records, the main deity of the temple was referred to as Porala Devi.

History

The temple has been referred to in many ancient inscriptions, including the Markandeya Purana, Ashoka inscriptions and travel accounts of ancient travellers. According to an inscription discovered in the vicinity of the temple, the temple around the clay idol was built in 8th century AD. It is a widely held belief that the temple was built by King Suratha, and that the king offered his own crown, studded with precious jewels, to be placed on the head of the deity. The king, having lost most of his kingdom in a war and being betrayed by his own ministers, is believed to have taken refuge under a sage named Sumedha in forests located around what is the location of the temple now. The clay idol of the main deity in the temple is historically believed to be up to 5000 years old. The king is reported to have carved the clay idol of Shri Rajarajeshwari himself and offered penance to the deity in return for his kingdom. Many ancient inscriptions alluding to the temple were reported around the temple, but were lost over time primarily due to the neglect of their keepers. The remaining inscriptions, which are available today were obtained in kariyangala village, Ammunje and in the temple itself and is now under custody of the Karnataka Government.

The region surrounding the temple were ruled by many dynasties including Kadamba, Chalukya, Alupa, Rashtrakoota, Hoisala, Vijayanagara, Ikkeri, Mysore etc. Most of these dynasties spent a lot of resources on this temple and donated agricultural lands for the benefit of the temple. Kings from the Alupa dynasty, which ruled the region around 710 AD to 720 AD were particularly noted to have contributed to the development of the temple and to have encouraged the worship of Shri Rajarajeshwari in the region. In later years, Queen Chennammaji of Keladi is reported to have visited the temple and gifted the temple with a grand chariot.

Architecture

Records written by Abdul Razzak in 1448 suggest that the temple was initially built from molten brass. He recorded that the temple had four platforms. An image of the deity, 5 to 6 feet in height, with red rubies for eyes were present on the highest of the platforms. Today, the idol of the main deity, Shri Rajarajeshwari is a stucco image of the deity with a height of 10 feet. The clay used for making the idol was specially prepared with herbal mixtures for added strength. The temple also has smaller idols for other deities including Subramanya, Bhadhrakali, Mahaganapathi and Saraswathi. During a religious event named Lepashta Gandha, the idols are coated with a special soil mixture with eight medicinal properties once every 12 years. The soil used for coating was prepared hundreds of years ago and not prepared freshly on each occasion. The roof of Mukhamantapa, a section of the temple has many Gods and Goddesses exquisitely carved in wood. The roofs of other sections of the temple like the Dhwajastambha, the Garbagriha and the Pillar of lights are covered in copper plates.

Poojas

Poojas are conducted on a daily basis and during special occasions. The Head Priest of the temple is madhava bhat. He is responsible for the daily and special poojas. The daily poojas include the morning pooja, which is conducted at 8.30 AM, the noon Mahapooja, which is conducted at 12.30 PM and the night pooja, conducted at 8.30 pm.

Poojas conducted on special occasions are as follows:
 Simha Sankramana
 Souramana Ugadi
 Gokulashtami
 4th day of Bhadrapada Shukla
 Kadiru Habba
 Navarathri
 Deepavali
 Kartika Bahula Padya 
 Laksha Deepotsava (on new moon day of the Karthika month)
 Subramanya Panchami and Shashti Festivals
 Dhanurmasotsava
 Mahashivarathri Festival
 Annual Festival (on Sankranthi day of the Meena month)

Polali Chendu festival

The Polali Chendu festival, also known as the football festival, is a widely popular football game which is conducted for a period of five days during the annual temple festival, seven days before avabritha. The football, which is a leather ball, is made by a cobbler family in Mijar. An oil miller family from Kadapu Karia is given the responsibility of bringing the ball from the cobbler family, wherein they announce the date of the commencement of the game after they place the ball in the freshly cleaned frontyard of Malali Ballal. On the evening of the first day of the family, the cobbler family place the ball and a palm leaf umbrella on the gopuram of the temple. After offering prayers to the deity, the ball is taken to the football field and the game is commenced. Up to five hundred people compete in the games, though any number of people may compete. The objective of the game is to get the ball to the opposition's side. The game historically represents the fight of good over evil and the car festival at the end of the games are said to represent the victory of the good over the evil.

Annual festival

An annual festival is celebrated at the temple during the month of March.The festival lasts for one month. During the festival the idol of the temple deity is placed on a circular crown called Prabhavathi, which is beautifully decorated for the purpose. On the 4th day of the festival, the idol is placed on Simhasana Katte, a platform approximately 100 metres from the temple and a special pooja is performed.

See also

 Madhur Temple
 Sri Gopalakrishna Temple Kumble
 List of Hindu temples in India

References

External links
 

Hindu temples in Dakshina Kannada district